Ligovsky Prospekt is a major street in Saint Petersburg. Before the establishment of the city, it was a street leading to Novgorod, used by the people living in the villages around the Neva delta. 

Between 1718-25, when Saint Petersburg was the capital of Russia, construction began on the Ligovsky Canal. The canal was used to transfer water from the river to fountains of the Summer Garden, hence the name of the street and the canal. After the flood of 1777 all the fountains were demolished, and later the canal was as well.

Ligovsky Prospekt today
The Ligovsky Prospekt is one of the largest streets in Saint Petersburg. It extends from Oktyabrskiy Big Concert Hall, Vosstaniya Square and Nevsky Prospekt, and runs through southern Saint Petersburg, onto Moskovsky Prospekt and the Moscow Triumphal Gate.

Names of the street

 Moskovskaya Street; during 1739 to the late eighteenth century
 Ligovsky Canal Embankment; during the nineteenth century
 Ligovskaya Street; during 1892 to 1952
 Stalingradsky Prospekt; during 1952 to 1956
 Ligovsky Prospekt; during 1956 to present

Streets in Saint Petersburg